Yosemitea is a genus of wasps belonging to the family Pteromalidae, containing a single described species from the United States, Yosemitea latifrons.

References

Pteromalidae
Insects described in 1993
Insects of the United States